Ignatius Singer (c. 1853–1926) was a British writer and speaker on scientific, economic, philological and theological topics during the late 19th and early 20th centuries. He was also an industrial chemist and innovator in the field of textile technology. Born in Hungary, he settled in England and spent some years in Australia and New Zealand.

Early life
From a Jewish background, Singer was born and educated in Budapest. He became a British subject 
around 1884.

Singer's Simplified Grammar of the Hungarian language was published in London in 1882 in Trübner's Collection of Simplified Grammars. The collection, devoted to the principal Asiatic and European languages, was edited by the English orientalist Edward Henry Palmer (1840-1882).

Australia 1885–1891
Reported as "just arrived from London" at Adelaide in February 1885, his first lecture in the colony was entitled "An Atheist's Apology and Defence". In a court case where he was called as a witness, he refused to take the oath on the grounds of his atheism.

Singer had to "perform menial offices" to earn a living in South Australia. Not long after his arrival he was giving speeches and taking part in demonstrations for the labour movement. He was described as "really a clever man, notwithstanding that he looks so insignificant. He is a little, old-style chap, with a stoop, but having a splendid head and a keen bright eye... with his determined face and his grotesque headgear... Germanish from habit to dress, though he has more of the French politeness than the Teutonic gruffness." His speeches were found impressive, "but the drawback to his general acceptance as a speaker is the unintelligibility which a thick foreign accent imparts to him".

Campaigning
Working with L. H. Berens, Singer played a leading part in establishing and editing a radical weekly journal, Our Commonwealth, a predecessor of The Herald of Adelaide. He became editor of this paper, which campaigned for social reform and rejected organised Christianity. Singer and Berens were instrumental also in founding the Adelaide Democratic Club in 1887.

Around 1886, together with Berens and others, Singer began a campaign in Adelaide for the taxation of land values as advocated by Henry George, who visited Adelaide in 1890. Singer became a leading figure among the Single Taxers of South Australia.

Wool cleaning device
While in Australia Singer developed a solvent scouring device using carbon bisulphide in the cleaning of sheep's wool. Later when back in England he set up this "very elaborate machine" at Messrs. Isaac Holden's works in Thornton Road, Bradford, and demonstrated it before the Society of Dyers and Colorists at Bradford Technical College.

Return to England
About 1891 Singer returned to England and settled in Yorkshire, as did Berens. Singer was "engaged in chemical works at Calverley, near Leeds" in the years up to 1898. In 1893 he was working as a chemist in "an English cotton manufactory".

The Story of My Dictatorship (1893)
Singer and Berens jointly wrote The Story of My Dictatorship (1893), advocating tax reform. This was described as a "utopian novel clearly indicating Georgist influence", and sold over 100,000 copies.

Some Unrecognized Laws of Nature (1897)
Singer and Berens also collaborated on Some Unrecognized Laws of Nature (1897), published in England by Messrs. John Murray.

The Dial said of this work that it "offers to the physicist greatly varied interest. Seldom does one find propositions more clearly enunciated or more concisely and logically discussed. Their exhaustive analysis holds attention and forces conclusions as to many of the terms and conventions of modern science, some of which have claimed the highest prerogative..." The New Age was reported to have "devoted seven columns of not altogether unfavourable criticism" to the book, claiming "That it propounds a new theory of heat, light, magnetism and electricity". The work also received an extensive review in Popular Science for October 1897, which regarded it as "a brave attempt to solve" the "riddle of the universe". According to this account, the book proposed the four fundamental physical principles of "persistence, resistance, reciprocity, and equalization". It addressed the "forbidden problem" of gravitation, asserting that the gravitational force between two bodies depended not only on their mass and the distance between them (as in the Newtonian description) but also in differences in the "state of excitation" of the bodies. A less favourable review in Knowledge (1 April 1898) condemned the book as "bristling with mistaken ideas".

Australia and New Zealand 1898–1902
In January 1898 Singer and Michael Flurscheim disembarked at Adelaide on their way to New Zealand, where they intended to settle. While in New Zealand Singer and Flurscheim established a factory and a loan society. An Ignatius Singer living in Stokes Valley patented a design of milk churn in 1900. The two men returned to Europe in 1902.

Later life and death
Singer worked as analytical chemist to the Bradford Dyers' Association. 
His paper on "The causes of the progress and retardation of the artificial color industry in England" was published in the Journal of the Society of Dyers and Colorists for May 1910.

Singer was said to be still "working as a chemist in Bradford" in 1917. His death was reported in the Yorkshire Observer of 8 June 1926. He had had one son Louis and one daughter Kathleen.

The Rival Philosophies... (1919)
Singer's 1917 booklet The Theocracy of Jesus was reviewed with apparent approval in The Humanist, which gave the work's message as follows: "As a theology Christianity stands self-condemned. As an ethical inspiration it has never been given a fair chance of success. Jesus was not a theologian, but a plain moral teacher,..."

In 1919 Singer expanded on this theme in his final major work, The Rival Philosophies of Jesus and of Paul. Here, he argued that the original message of Jesus had been distorted by Saint Paul and the Gospel writers. The book was received unfavourably by Jewish and Christian commentators. They pointed out that "Mr. Singer is not a professed theologian" and claimed that he was "totally ignorant of the subjects which he undertakes to treat", appearing to draw neither on "Judaism and Jewish literature" nor on "the literature of modern evangelical thinkers". One reviewer found the book "keen and suggestive, but dogmatic in spirit and crude in scholarship", while for another it was "hard to take some authors seriously. Mr. Singer is one of them. He puts before us, as new discoveries, theories that are hoary with old age..." The New Statesman took a different view, saying "We must be grateful to the author for his, at times, brilliant insistence on the truth that only by accepting the principles of Jesus can humanity work out its early destiny and establish a just and stable civilisation".

Works
 Ignatius Singer (1882). Simplified Grammar of the Hungarian Language. London: Trübner & Co.

Notes

References

19th-century British writers
20th-century British writers
British chemists
Writers from Budapest
1926 deaths
Year of birth uncertain